The 2003 Southland Conference baseball tournament was held from May 21 through 23, 2003 to determine the champion of the Southland Conference in the sport of college baseball for the 2003 season.  The event pitted the top six finishers from the conference's regular season in a double-elimination tournament held at Warhawk Field, home field of Louisiana–Monroe in Monroe, Louisiana.  Sixth-seeded  won their second overall championship and claimed the automatic bid to the 2003 NCAA Division I baseball tournament.

Seeding and format
The top six finishers from the regular season were seeded one through six.  They played a double-elimination tournament.

Bracket and results

All-Tournament Team
The following players were named to the All-Tournament Team.

Most Valuable Player
Rusty Begnaud was named Tournament Most Valuable Player.  Begnaud was a pitcher for McNeese State.

References

Tournament
Southland Conference Baseball Tournament
Southland Conference baseball tournament
Southland Conference baseball tournament